Ita Egbe is a village located in  Ipokia Local Government Area of Ogun State with the population of 1776 as of 1963 according to the Nigeria Population Census, it is noted for its extensive agricultural activities around the area and by being one of the largest palm oil producers in Ipokia Local Government of Ogun state.

Postal code
Ita Egbe postal code is 112101. It is the unified postal code used in Ipokia Local Government Area of Ogun State, Nigeria.

Location

Cuisine
Every family at Ita Egbe eats either Tuwo that is made with corn flour or Ẹ̀kọ mostly referred to as pap with a delicious soup everyday and this is linked to the fact that they produce tonnes of corn every year.

Other cuisine are:
Fufu
Eba
Jollof rice

Occupation
The main occupation of Ita Egbe is agriculture. Both male and female workers are involved in one or another aspect of agriculture.

Other occupations include:
Hunting
Fishing
Blogging 
Programming

Being one of the villages near Nigeria/Benin border, some of the villagers smuggles rice, cooking oil, turkey, chicken and petrol among others

Education

References

Populated places in Ogun State